Michael Lawrence may refer to:

 Michael Lawrence (filmmaker), American filmmaker
 Michael Lawrence (writer) (born 1943), English children's books writer
 Michael Lawrence (rugby league) (born 1990),  for the Huddersfield Giants in the Super League
 Mike Lawrence (bridge) (born 1940), American bridge player and author
 Mike Lawrence (comedian) (born 1983), American comedian
 Michael S. Lawrence (born 1975), American geneticist

See also
 Michael Laurence (1935–2015), Australian television scriptwriter, actor and producer